Tonawanda Municipal Building is a historic municipal building located at Kenmore in Erie County, New York. It was designed by the noted Buffalo architecture firm Green and James and built in 1936 with funds provide by the Works Progress Administration. It is a two-story, steel frame and brick building clad in limestone with Art Deco design elements. The building serves as home to both the Village of Kenmore and Town of Tonawanda governments.

It was listed on the National Register of Historic Places in 2013.

Gallery

References

External links

Official Website of the Village of Kenmore
Official Website of the Town of Tonawanda
Waymarking: Village of Kenmore, NY

Works Progress Administration in New York (state)
City and town halls on the National Register of Historic Places in New York (state)
Art Deco architecture in New York (state)
Government buildings completed in 1936
Government buildings in New York (state)
National Register of Historic Places in Erie County, New York